HMCS Curlew was a commissioned minesweeper and patrol vessel of the Royal Canadian Navy (RCN) that served in the First World War. Constructed in Ontario in 1892, Curlew was initially a Canadian government fisheries patrol vessel on the East Coast of Canada. In 1912, the ship was fitted as a minesweeper and in 1914, joined the RCN. Curlew spent the entire war on the East Coast of Canada. Following the war, the ship was taken out of service and sold in 1921.

Description
Curlew had a gross register tonnage of 185 tons, which did not increase during the First World War when it became her official displacement. The vessel was fitted with a ram bow, giving the ship the appearance of a gunboat. The ship was powered by a compound steam engine driving one screw creating 50 nominal horsepower. The vessel was armed with three machine guns and had a complement of 23.

Construction and career
Curlew was ordered from Polson Iron Works by Charles Tupper, Minister of Marine and Fisheries and constructed at their yard in Owen Sound, Ontario. Curlew was launched in 1892 and deployed to the East Coast of Canada as a Department of Marine and Fisheries fisheries patrol vessel. Curlew remained in this duty until 1912 when the ship was fitted for minesweeping. In 1914, the ship was commissioned by the RCN with the outbreak of the First World War and was used as a patrol and minesweeping craft on the East Coast until the war's end in 1918. Following the war, Curlew was paid off by the RCN and put up for sale, being sold in 1921.

Notes

Citations

Sources

External links
 Converted civilian vessels

Minesweepers of the Royal Canadian Navy
Cruisers of Canada
1892 ships
World War I naval ships of Canada